The Fédération Internationale des Traducteurs (English: International Federation of Translators) is an international grouping of associations of translators, interpreters and terminologists. More than 100 professional associations are affiliated, representing over 80,000 translators in 55 countries. The goal of the Federation is to promote professionalism in the disciplines which it represents. It seeks constantly to improve conditions for the profession in all countries and to uphold translators' rights and freedom of expression.

The FIT maintains operational relations with UNESCO and promotes International Translation Day.

Objectives
The objectives of the FIT are:
to link and bring together existing associations of translators, interpreters and terminologists;
to encourage and facilitate the formation of such associations in countries where they do not already exist;
to provide member associations with information about conditions of work, technological tools, initial and ongoing training, and all questions useful to the profession;
to develop and maintain, among all member associations, good relations that serve the interests of translators;
to uphold the moral and material rights of translators throughout the world;.
to promote the recognition of the professions of translator, interpreter and terminologist, enhance the status of translators in society, and promote translation as a science and an art.

Committees
The Federation, through its committees, undertakes to meet the various expectations of its members by addressing matters of training, conditions of work, the various aspects of the profession, and the categories of translators, interpreters and terminologists. To take part in the work of one of the twelve committees is an individual contribution to the profession as a whole.

Governing bodies
The FIT's supreme body is the statutory congress, which is held every three years. It brings together delegations from the member associations, and it elects the council, which in turn elects its executive committee and directs the FIT until the next world congress. The governing bodies are supported by different committees, which report to the council annually about their activities, and to the congress. The statutory congress is followed by an open congress, which is an outstanding platform for exchanges among all professionals in the translation sector.

Publications and public relations
The FIT is a worldwide organization, composed of the national translation organizations from over 60 countries. It represents over 100,000 translators worldwide. The journal BABEL and the bulletin Translatio are the Federation's quarterly publications, and are widely disseminated. Babel is a scholarly publication presenting articles from all round the world. Translatio is the Federation's information organ, telling members about its activities and those of its committees and member associations. The proceedings of each congress are also published, and serve as a further source of valuable information to those interested in the many facets of the translation profession. In addition, FIT participates, between its own world congresses, in the organization of seminars, colloquia and round table discussions on various aspects of the profession.

Secretariat
FIT has had a part-time secretariat (20 hours a week) since 1999. The secretariat is the anchor for FIT's membership administration and activities. The secretariat works closely with the EC and Council and relevant task forces.

The FIT Secretariat has been located in Switzerland since October 2010, after 11 years in Canada, and is run by FIT's Executive Director, Jeannette Ørsted.

See also
List of translators and interpreters associations

References

External links
 FIT website

International Federation of Translators (FIT)
International professional associations
International organisations based in Switzerland